Tobias Heinze (c. 1593–1653) (also Heintze) was an Estonian cabinetmaker and woodcarver based in Tallinn.

He is best known for his carving of St Christopher which stands in the church of St Nicholas’ in Tallinn. It was carved to support the pulpit. He also made modifications to the Holy Kinship altar which was originally in Tallinn town hall but bought by a rural congregation in 1652. This is now also preserved in St Nicholas' Church, Tallinn.

List of works

St Christopher statue, St. Nicholas' Church, Tallinn, Estonia. 1624
Pulpit, Holy Cross Church, Harju-Risti, Estonia 1630
Altar, Keila Church, Central Square, Keila, Estonia 1632
Pulpit, Keila Church, Central Square, Keila, Estonia 1632
Pulpit, St Nicholas’ Church, Kose, Estonia
Pulpit, The Church of the Blessed Virgin Mary, Jõelähtme, Estonia
Pulpit Leesi Church, 1646?

References

Estonian Baroque sculptors
Estonian cabinetmakers
People from Tallinn
Year of birth uncertain
1653 deaths